is a Japanese manga series written and illustrated by Yūichi Katō. It has been serialized since August 2017 in Shōnen Gahōsha's Young King magazine and its chapters have been collected into eleven tankōbon volumes. 

In December 2022, Katō and Suoshiro would team up again to start a third Anjō-san manga spinoff: .

Plot
In a high school in Kasugai, Seto is a serious student who lives a quiet and ordinary life. But when his mischievous classmate, Anna Anjō, begins teasing and hanging out with him on a regular basis, it starts an interesting relationship between them. The story follows the lives and antics of the two polar opposites, both in appearance and personality, as they develop into a romantic couple through their many playful—and sometimes erotic—interactions.

Anjō is accompanied by her female friends, Toyoda and Chita, while Seto is accompanied by his male friends, Inuyama and Tokio. As they all grow friendly with one another, each person becomes romantically linked to their respective partner within the group as the story progresses.

Characters
Most of the names of the characters are based on cities located in Aichi Prefecture.

 (voice comic)
Seto is a bespectacled high school student in his second year, who is the president of his class. He is a plain and ordinary-looking boy who initially has no interest in girls and only cares about his grades. He struggles trying to improve the person that he is and is unsure about his future ambitions in life. In their initial encounters, he sees Anjō as too erotic, he gets very lewd thoughts around her, and does not know anything about her or understand why she teases him. After he defended her from harsh words by a classmate, and as the two started to hang out more, he has developed serious feelings for her. He is named after the city of Seto, Aichi.

 (voice comic)
Anjō is a gyaru who is in the same class as Seto. She is incredibly beautiful, flamboyant, athletic, and popular with a cheery personality and outgoing kindness. When the two first met, she took a liking to Seto  because of his helpfulness and hard-working nature, then developed a deep crush for him after one of the boys in their class spoke nasty things about her behind her back that Seto refuted. Ever since, she teases and flirts with him constantly, sometimes to lewd extents. She hopes to follow in her mother's footsteps and become a professional beautician, and will sometimes use Seto as styling practice.  She is named after the city of Anjō, Aichi. 

 (voice comic)
Toyoda is one of Anjō's friends. Nicknamed , she is a "cool beauty" who speaks in a Kansai dialect and sports long jet-black hair. She likes cute gacha-style toys, although she is embarrassed by this as she feels having an affinity for such things does not fit her outward appearance and personality. Her dream is to become the president of a company that creates fancy mascot characters. She takes drawing lessons alongside Inuyama. She is named after the city of Toyota, Aichi.

Inuyama is Seto's best friend since junior high. He is an otaku who is exceptionally good at drawing and designing cosplay costumes. At first, he takes interest in Toyoda simply because she has a large chest, but after learning that they share an interest in cute toys when the two met at a gacha machine, and as they both worked together in a mascot character contest, he starts developing deeper feelings for her. Later in the story, he has the desire to ask Toyoda out, but is scared from possible rejection and the sadness that would follow. He is named after the city of Inuyama, Aichi.

 (voice comic)
Chita is another friend of Anjō's. Nicknamed , she is a mostly quiet girl with very short hair, thick eyebrows, and a petite figure. She is a foodie with a big appetite who can be seen eating large amounts of food. She dreams of traveling overseas after graduation. Early on in the story, she appears jealous of Seto spending most of his time hanging out with Anjō, despite knowing nothing about her, as she hopes the least Seto can do is keep Anjō happy, or else she will not forgive him.  She is named after the city of Chita, Aichi.

Tokio is Toyoda's brother. He attends Anjō and Seto's high school and is very popular with the girls there because of his attractiveness. He becomes a big eater, like Chita, by going out with her on several food stops throughout the story. The two have known each other since childhood and appear to have feelings for one another. He is upset at the idea that Chita sees and treats him as a big brother while he has never seen her as a sibling-type and always as just a girl. He is good friends with Seto and Inuyama, as they all help each other with their school studies.

Komaki is the nurse at the high school. She is a free-spirited young woman with a warm personality who deeply cares about the students she looks after. She often offers life advice to the students around the school, and many of them see Komaki as a "big sister" of sorts. She has a bond with Seto through the two exchanging similar tastes in manga. In the main series, as well as her first spinoff series, she can be seen with her best friend and colleague, who is an art teacher. She is named after the city of Komaki, Aichi.

Media

Manga 
Yancha Gal no Anjō-san is written and illustrated by Yūichi Katō. The series has its origins on Pixiv, where Katō published short stories featuring Anjō and Seto, as early as March 2017. A manga then began serialization in issue #17 of Shōnen Gahōsha's Young King magazine on August 12, 2017. Shōnen Gahōsha has collected its chapters into individual tankōbon volumes. As of December 11, 2022, eleven volumes have been published. Outside of Japan, the manga is published in South Korea by AK Comics and in Spain by Kitsune Manga.

A spinoff manga, Anjō-san no Gakkō no Hokenshitsu no Komaki-sensei, written by Katō and illustrated by Tsubaki Ayasugi, was serialized in Young King starting from issue #11 on May 13, 2019 and ending in issue #14 on June 28, 2021, and has three tankōbon volumes published from July 13, 2020 to July 12, 2021.

In the following issue, another spinoff, Yancha Gal no Anjō-san-tachi: Kō-1-hen, also written by Katō and illustrated by Suoshiro, was serialized in Young King starting from issue #12 on May 27, 2019 and ending in issue #20 on September 26, 2021, and has six tankōbon volumes published from December 23, 2019 to December 12, 2022.

On December 12, 2022, in issue #1 of Young King, Katō and Suoshiro started a third, isekai-themed spinoff, Komaki-sensei no Dungeon Hoken Dayori feat. Yancha Gal no Anjō-san.

Volume list

Yancha Gal no Anjō-san 

|}

Anjō-san no Gakkō no Hokenshitsu no Komaki-sensei 

|}

Yancha Gal no Anjō-san-tachi: Kō-1-hen 

|}

Voice comic 
A voice comic of the first volume of Yancha Gal no Anjō-san was released on March 31, 2022. The voice comic utilizes voice actors from the talent agency Yellow Tail.

Reception
Yancha Gal no Anjō-san has been compared to other "teasing" romantic comedy manga, specifically Teasing Master Takagi-san, Uzaki-chan Wants to Hang Out!, and Don't Toy with Me, Miss Nagatoro, in that the four manga all share a similar story structure that revolves around a schoolgirl and a schoolboy who start as friends that simply hang out together, then slowly develop into a romantic couple with the flirtatious girl teasing, or "bullying" the boy, who in turn has intimate feelings for the girl, but is too shy to admit them to her.

In August 2019, the series was nominated for the 5th Next Manga Awards in the print category and finished 19th out of 50 nominees. It was also nominated for AnimeJapan's "Manga We Want to See Animated" poll that same year, but failed to place in the top 10. In July 2020, the series ranked eighth in the Tsutaya Comic Awards.

Works cited
 "Ch." is shortened form for chapter and refers to a chapter number of the Yancha Gal no Anjō-san manga.

Notes

References

External links
 Yancha Gal no Anjō-san at Shōnen Gahōsha 

Gyaru in fiction
Japanese webcomics
Romantic comedy anime and manga
School life in anime and manga
Seinen manga
Shōnen Gahōsha manga
Slice of life anime and manga
Webcomics in print